Facet cyst or Postoperative synovial facet cysts is the cyst of Lumbar intraspinal synovial joint and ganglion. The cause of facet cysts is not well known.

References 

Spine